Lycosuchus ("wolf crocodile") is an extinct genus of carnivorous therocephalians which lived in the Middle Permian 265—260 Ma existing for approximately . As a member of the Lycosuchidae, the genus represents one of the earliest diverging therocephalians. The type species Lycosuchus vanderrieti is known from a handful of well-preserved specimens featuring the cranium and lower jaw; the holotype US D173 housed at the University of Stellenbosch, South Africa, is a near complete occluded skull. Specimen MB.R. 995, housed at the Museum für Naturkunde Berlin, Germany, consists of a near complete and isolated lower jaw, along with a partial snout and brain case. With the help of μCT data, Pusch et al (2020)  described the endocranial anatomy of Lycosuchus vanderrieti.  
It was a medium-sized predator, reaching 1.2 m (3.8 ft) in length with a skull 23 cm long., typical of early therocephalians. L. vanderrieti bore two functional canines in each maxilla, possibly due to a protracted tooth replacement. Both the upper canines and the single canine of the lower jaw are serrated.

Discovered in South Africa, it was named by paleontologist Robert Broom in 1903 and later assigned by him to Therocephalia.

See also
 List of therapsids

Notes and references 

 R. Broom (1913) A revision of the reptiles of the Karroo. Annals of the South African Museum 7(6):361-366

External links 
http://fossils.valdosta.edu/fossil_pages/fossils_per/t72.html Cast of skull and jaw courtesy of the National Museum, Bloemfontein South Africa

Therocephalia genera
Guadalupian synapsids
Guadalupian synapsids of Africa
Fossil taxa described in 1903
Taxa named by Robert Broom
Guadalupian genus first appearances
Guadalupian genus extinctions